Komukai Dam is a gravity dam located in Chiba Prefecture in Japan. The dam is used for water supply. The catchment area of the dam is 11.3 km2. The dam impounds about 10  ha of land when full and can store 950 thousand cubic meters of water. The construction of the dam was started on 1972 and completed in 1975.

References

Dams in Chiba Prefecture
1975 establishments in Japan